Suzan Najm Aldeen (born 1973) is a Syrian actress, whose memorable roles have earned her wide acclaim throughout the Arab world. After enrolling in the Faculty of Engineering, Architecture Department in Damascus, she was offered the opportunity to become an actress. This, however, did not stop her from pursuing her studies and graduating as an architect. Starting in 1990s Syrian dramas, Najm Aldeen went on to star in several renowned Arab series and movies.

Biography
Najm Aldeen was born on 24 November 1973, in Duraykish to a Syrian Alawite family. She is one of six children, her father who was a poet, Najm Aldeen Saleh, was a member in the Syrian Parliament, and her mother, Dawlat Al-Abbasi, is also a poet. The actress lived with her parents, until she graduated, and then she went to Damascus to study architecture in the Damascus University. During that, she entered in the art society, that brought her being an actress, but that didn't hinder to continue to study in the university to be an architect. In the 1990s, Suzan became to play roles in the Syrian drama, first secondary, and then as a protagonist in many series. Her first interpretation was "Aldakhliah" ("الدخيلة"), with the Syrian actor Jihad Saad.

Personal life
In 1995, Najm Aldeen married a businessman, Siraj Al-Attasi, but their marriage ended in 2014 due to their contradicting opinions regarding the Syrian civil war. They had four children together.

Series

 Alkawaser (الكواسر) – Syria (سوريا)
 Aldakheelah (الدخيلة) – Syria (سوريا)
 Nihayat rajol shojaa – The end of a courageous man (نهاية رجل شجاع)–Syria (سوريا)
 Alzhaher Baibars (الظاهر بيبرس) – Syria (سوريا)
 Khan alharir – The Silk market (خان الحرير) – Syria (سوريا)
 Hanin (حنين) – Syria (سوريا)
 Salah aldin (صلاح الدين) – Syria (سوريا)
 Moluk altawaef – Communions' kings (ملوك الطوائف) – Syria (سوريا)
 Tuyoor alshawk – Birds of Thorns (طيور الشوك) – Syria (سوريا)
 Forsat al'omr – Opportunity of a lifetime (فرصة العمر) – Syria (سوريا)
 Zawj alsett – Lady's husband (زوج الست) – Syria (سوريا)
 Ommahat – Mothers (أمهات) – Syria (سوريا)
 Gibran Khalil Gibran (جبران خليل جبران) – Syria / Lebanon (لبنان / سوريا)
 Noqtat Nizam – System's point (نقطة نظام) – Egypt (مصر)
 Alharebah – The Escape (الهربة) – Syria (سوريا)
 Farouk Omar
 Wesh Tani – The Other Face (وش تاني) – Egypt (مصر)

Series under preparation 
 Shoq (شوق)

Lately Suzan Najm Aldeen has signed her participation in the series "Shoq" as a leading role "Rose", a captive taken by ISIS based on a true story. The role Najm Aldeen is playing focusses on a subject that is spotted by global public opinion, human rights and United Nations, as it will be reflecting their concern in relation to sex slaves taken by ISIS. Actor Bassem Yakhor plays next to her and the series is directed by Rasha Shorbatgi.

External links
 Official website

References 

1973 births
Living people
Syrian Alawites
People from Tartus Governorate
20th-century Syrian actresses
Syrian stage actresses